The Electricity sector in South Africa is an important part of energy in South Africa.
Eskom is the state-owned electricity provider. A 2016 study compared long term prices of different types of new powerplants.

Electricity production

In 2020, coal generated 86% of electricity, so the carbon intensity of electricity generation is higher than most other countries at over 800 gCO2/kWh.

In 2018 nuclear was the second most important single source of electricity production, at 4.5%. South Africa has two commercial nuclear reactors, at Koeberg nuclear power station.

6.6% of electricity production came from renewables (wind power, hydropower, solar power, and to a smaller degree biofuels), while oil provided less than 0.1%.

History 
Prior to the establishment of Eskom the provision of electricity was dominated by municipalities and private companies.  The city of Kimberley was the first user of public electricity in South Africa when it installed electric streetlights run off a coal fired power plant in 1882 to reduce crime at night.  The first central power station and distribution system in South Africa consisting of a 150 kW generator with two boilers and located at Cape Town Harbour was completed in 1891 to supply power to government buildings in the nearby city. In 1893 the town (now neighbourhood) of Wynberg in Cape Town opened a power station to provide power to a local tram system and public streetlights.  This was followed by the first municipal power station built by the City of Cape Town in 1895 with the construction of the Graaff Electric Lighting Works to power 775 streetlights. Not all early power stations were successful, such as the short lived President Street Power Station in Johannesburg. Constructed in 1906, the use of unsuitable fuel in an experimental engine design lead to an explosion in 1907.

Eskom was founded by the Electricity Act of 1922 which allowed for the establishment of a government owned non-profit company to provide electricity.  In 1948 Eskom bought out the Victoria Falls and Transvaal Power Company with government support for £14.5 million (roughly equivalent to £2.55 billion in 2017) to become South Africa's primary electricity provider.  Eskom dropped its non-profit mandate in the late 1970s and government control over the company was expanded in 1998 with the passing of the Eskom Amendment Act.

Eskom

Eskom is a South African electricity public utility, established in 1923 as the Electricity Supply Commission (ESCOM) and also known by its Afrikaans name Elektrisiteitsvoorsieningskommissie (EVKOM), by the government of the Union of South Africa in terms of the Electricity Act (1922).  Eskom represents South Africa in the Southern African Power Pool. The utility is the largest producer of electricity in Africa, is among the top seven utilities in the world in terms of generation capacity and among the top nine in terms of sales.  It is the largest of South Africa's state owned enterprises.  Eskom operates a number of notable power stations, including Kendal Power Station, and Koeberg nuclear power station in the Western Cape Province, the only nuclear power plant in Africa. The company is divided into Generation, Transmission and Distribution divisions and together Eskom generates approximately 95% of electricity used in South Africa.

References

See also
 Energy law

Electricity economics
Energy in South Africa
Electric power in South Africa